Leraje (also Leraye, Leriac, Loray, Oray, or Zoray) is a demon mentioned in demonological grimoires.  He appears in the Lesser Key of Solomon, Johann Weyer's Pseudomonarchia Daemonum, and Jacques Collin de Plancy's Dictionnaire Infernal.

Description 
Leraye is described as an archer who starts battles and putrefies arrow-wounds.

The Lesser Key additionally notes that he wears green while Weyer (and so De Plancy) attribute him with the power of driving away mobs.

Legions and standing 
Leraye is the fourteenth spirit in the Lesser Key of Solomon (in some versions as Leraje, and in Rudd's variant as Leriac), the thirteenth spirit in the Pseudomonarchia Daemonum (as Loray or Oray), and appears as Oray in the Dictionnaire Infernal.

In the Grand Grimoire, Leraye (as Loray or Zoray) is listed as a subordinate of Sargatanas.  All other sources claim he rules 30 legions of spirits.

According to Rudd, Leraje is opposed by the Shemhamphorasch angel Mehahel.

References 

Goetic demons